Antonello Manacorda (born 1970) is an Italian violinist and conductor, especially of opera, who has worked internationally. He has been the chief conductor of the Kammerakademie Potsdam and of Het Gelders Orkest.

Career 
Born in Turin, Manacorda studied violin at the conservatory of his hometown with Sergio Lamberto, graduating with distinction. He continued his studies with Herman Krebbers in Amsterdam, with Eduard Schmieder and with Franco Gulli. In 1994, Claudio Abbado appointed him concertmaster of the Gustav Mahler Jugendorchester. Manacorda founded in 1997, with colleagues and Abbado, the Mahler Chamber Orchestra (MCO), for which he has served as concertmaster and as vice president.

He conducted in 2001 a production of Mozart's La clemenza di Tito in opera houses of  Lombardy. He decided to focus on conducting, and studied on a scholarship of the DeSono association for music with Jorma Panula.

From 2003 to 2006, he was artistic director of the chamber music at the Académie Européenne de Musique of the Aix-en-Provence Festival. He assisted Marc Minkowski in a new production of Offenbach's Les Contes d'Hoffmann at the Opéra National de Lyon. In 2006, he conducted Paisiello's Il barbiere di Siviglia at the Teatro degli Arcimboldi in Milan. The Kammerakademie Potsdam was awarded the Echo Klassik 2015 in the category best ensemble/orchestra, for their recording of Schubert's symphonies No. 2 and No. 4, as part of a cycle of all his symphonies.

In 2011, Manacorda began in collaboration with Damiano Michieletto a project at La Fenice in Venice to present the Mozart trilogy of operas after da Ponte, followed by his Die Zauberflöte. He conducted Rossini's  Otello at the Theater an der Wien in 2016, staged by Damiano Michieletto, and at the Glyndebourne Festival a new production of Béatrice et Bénédict Hector Berlioz, staged by Laurent Pelly. In 2018, he conducted a new production of Meyerbeer's L'Africaine – Vasco da Gama at the Frankfurt Opera. A review noted that he realized both the lyric finesse and delicacy of changing emotions ("lyrische Finesse und Delikatesse vieler Passagen für die wechselnden Gefühlslagen") and the power of star wars ("da tobte der Sternensturm") including the failure of the mission ("samt Scheitern des Raumschiffs"), without the empty noise often associated with grand opera ("ohne leeres Dröhnen alter 'Grand Opéra'“).

References

External links 
 
 
 Antonello Manacorda Operabase
 Am Mikrofon / Der Dirigent Antonello Manacorda Deutschlandfunk 6 January 2018
 Chefdirigent / Antonello Manacorda Kammerakademie Potsdam 2017
 Antonello Manacorda / Artistic Director, Kammerakademie Potsdam Humans of new work

Italian male conductors (music)
Italian classical violinists
1970 births
Living people
21st-century Italian conductors (music)
21st-century Italian male musicians
21st-century classical violinists
Male classical violinists